The Wellington Saints are a New Zealand basketball team based in Wellington. The Saints compete in the National Basketball League (NBL) and play their home games at TSB Bank Arena.

Team history
The Wellington Saints were founded in 1981. In 1982, the Exchequer Saints won the second division title, which promoted them to the first division for the 1983 season. The Saints went on to play in six straight championship games upon joining the NBL, winning titles in 1984, 1985, 1987 and 1988. They played in their seventh final in 1991, where they lost to the Hutt Valley Lakers.

At the end of the 1996 season, both the Saints and the Lakers were struggling to survive. They amalgamated for the 1997 season, becoming TransAlta Wellington. With fans wanting a 'real' name, for the 1998 season, they became the TransAlta Wizards. For the 1999 season, they returned to the original identity of Saints. The Saints returned to title contenders in the 2000s, as they finished runners-up in 2001 and 2008, and won their fifth title in 2003.

The 2010s were dominated by the Saints, as they played in every championship game between 2010 and 2019, except 2013. They claimed back-to-back championships in 2010 and 2011, before claiming their eighth title in 2014. With their ninth title in 2016, the Saints matched the Auckland Stars for most championships in NBL history. In 2017, the Saints made NBL history by becoming the first team to complete a perfect regular season, going 18–0. They went on to defeat the Canterbury Rams in the semi-finals before becoming the first team to complete an unbeaten season, capping off a perfect 20–0 campaign by beating the Southland Sharks 108–75 in the final. Their tenth championship set a new record for most in NBL history. The Saints returned to the final in 2018, but missed the chance at their first three-peat with a 98–96 loss to the Sharks. In 2019, the Saints completed their second undefeated regular season in three years, going 18–0, before completing another perfect 20–0 campaign by defeating the Hawke's Bay Hawks 78–68 in the final to win their 11th title.

The Saints sat out the 2020 season due to the COVID-19 pandemic. They returned in 2021 and won their 12th championship.

Current roster

CBL team
The Saints began in the second-tiered Conference Basketball League (CBL), winning the CBL title in 1982. In 1997, Wellington's second division team finished as runners-up in the CBL, and in 2001, the Wellington College Saints finished as CBL runners-up. In 2008, the Saints' second division team won the CBL championship with a 90–84 win over the Waikato Titans in the final.

References

External links
 Official team website
 
 Wellington Saints chairman Justin Toebes to miss last NBL finals
 Wellington Saints captain Damien Ekenasio looking for perfect end to 15-year NBL career
 Wellington Saints CEO Nick Mills contemplating going out on a high after 10th title
 Is the ABL Expanding Further East to the Pacific?
 Wellington Saints eye move to ASEAN Basketball League

Basketball teams in New Zealand
National Basketball League (New Zealand) teams
Sport in Wellington City
Basketball teams established in 1981
1981 establishments in New Zealand